The R477 road is a regional road in Ireland, located in coastal County Clare. It is a notable scenic route.

References

Regional roads in the Republic of Ireland
Roads in County Clare